The 2008 congressional elections in Arizona were held on November 4, 2008, to determine who would represent the state of Arizona in the United States House of Representatives, coinciding with the presidential election. Representatives are elected for two-year terms; those elected would serve in the 111th Congress from January 4, 2009, until January 3, 2011.

Arizona had eight seats in the House, apportioned according to the 2000 United States Census. Its 2007-2008 congressional delegation consisted of four Republicans and four Democrats. Two of the Democrats had taken Republican seats in 2006, and were at risk during the 2008 election. The delegation elected in 2008 consisted of three Republicans and five Democrats: district 1 changed party (from open Republican to Democratic), although CQ Politics had forecast districts 1, 3, 5 and 8 to be at some risk for the incumbent party.

The party primary elections were held September 2, 2008.

Overview

District 1 

This open seat was contested by Republican Sydney Ann Hay, a mining industry lobbyist; Democrat Ann Kirkpatrick, a former State Representative and prosecutor; Independent Brent Maupin, a Sedona engineer and businessman; and Libertarian Thane Eichenauer. The Cook Political Report ranked this race as 'Likely Democratic,' and  CQ Politics,  the Rothenberg Political Report, and The New York Times all forecast the race as 'Leans Democratic'.

This district had been represented by Republican Rick Renzi since 2003. In August 2007, Renzi announced he would not seek re-election, four months after the FBI raided Renzi's family business as part of a federal investigation. Renzi received only 52% of the vote compared to 44% for his Democratic opponent – Sedona civil rights attorney Ellen Simon – in 2006; George W. Bush won 54% of the vote in this northern Arizona district in 2004.

In the Democratic primary, Kirkpatrick won by almost 15 points, against publisher and former Phoenix TV newscaster Mary Kim Titla, mental health advocate Jeffrey Brown and attorney Howard Shanker. (Simon had announced her intention to run again, but then dropped out in May 2007, citing personal reasons.)

In the Republican primary, Hay, who ran unsuccessfully in 2002, earned a narrower-than-expected victory against Sandra L. B. Livingstone, Tom Hansen and Barry Hall. State Representative Bill Konopnicki, former Navajo County Supervisor Lewis Tenney and State Senator Tom O'Halleran were other potential candidates.
Race ranking and details from CQ Politics
Campaign contributions from OpenSecrets

Kirkpatrick earned endorsements from leaders in government, education, tribal communities, first responders, and other groups. Among those endorsing her were: Governor Janet Napolitano, U.S. Representative Gabby Giffords, U.S. Representative Harry Mitchell, the Arizona Education Association, the Arizona Police Association, the Arizona Conference of Police and Sheriffs, the International Association of Firefighters, Navajo County School Superintendent Linda Morrow, county sheriffs in Coconino, Gila, Graham, Greenlee, Navajo, and Pinal Counties, Coconino County School Superintendent Cecilia Owen, Pinal County School Superintendent Orlenda Roberts, Navajo Nation President Joe Shirley, San Carlos Apache Tribal Chairman Wendsler Nosie, White Mountain Apache Tribal Chairman Ronnie Lupe, former Navajo Nation president Dr. Peterson Zah, and many other tribal leaders. The Arizona Republic, the state's largest newspaper, and the White Mountain Independent and the Arizona Daily Sun, two of the most widely read newspapers in the district, also endorsed her candidacy.

Kirkpatrick ran on a platform of tax cuts for 86 million middle-class families, making health care affordable and accessible to all, and encouraging renewable energy projects to end America's dependence on foreign energy and create jobs for rural Arizona. She supports increasing teacher salaries, expanding SCHIP, and adding a division to the army. Kirkpatrick is known as an advocate for early education, Native Americans, and law enforcement. As a member of the Arizona State Legislature, Kirkpatrick was known for her willingness to work across party lines.

Results 
Kirkpatrick's victory resulted in a House gain for Democrats.

District 2 

This district has been represented by Republican Trent Franks since 2003. In what was essentially a rematch of the previous election, he was challenged by Democrat John Thrasher (campaign website), Libertarian Powell Gammill and Green William Crum. CQ Politics forecasts the race as 'Safe Republican'.
Race ranking and details from CQ Politics
Campaign contributions from OpenSecrets

Results 
Incumbent Trent Franks held on to his seat with almost 60% of the votes.

District 3 

This district has been represented by Republican John Shadegg since 1995. He was challenged by Democrat Bob Lord (campaign website), a tax attorney, and Libertarian Michael Shoen. Running as Independents were Mark Yannone (campaign website), Annie Loyd, Steve May and Edwin Winkler. CQ Politics forecasted the race as 'Leans Republican'.

An outspoken conservative, Shadegg has consistently been re-elected in this Republican-leaning district (Cook Partisan Voting Index of R+6) in the northern Phoenix suburbs which gave George W. Bush 57.9 percent of the vote in 2004. However, Lord outraised Shadegg in the first quarter of 2007 and even had more cash on hand compared to Shadegg, which resulted in an unusually competitive race. However, Shadegg's campaign team noted that Shadegg's funds are smaller than expected due to Shadegg donating most of the money in 2006 to fellow Republicans in a last-ditch, albeit lackluster attempt to retain control of Congress.

On February 11, 2008, incumbent Shadegg announced he would not run for an eighth term, saying that he wanted to "seek a new challenge in a different venue to advance the cause of freedom." However, on February 21, Shadegg retracted the statement and announced he would seek re-election. Over 140 Republicans in Congress had signed a letter asking Shadegg to keep his seat. Although it was speculated that he would run for the United States Senate if John McCain were to become president, Shadegg had expressed his intention to leave public life and return to the private sector before changing his mind.

Annie Loyd, running on a platform of "transpartisan politics", has been described by The Arizona Republic as a moderate. Born in South Dakota and a community activist in Los Angeles, Loyd is a 15-year resident of Phoenix. She has also appeared at Columbia University. Shadegg's 2006 opponent, consultant Herb Paine, announced his support for Loyd.

The race was covered in the East Valley Tribune and showed a 27% independent voter population and noted increased registration of independents, in a district of 600,000 people cutting across urban Phoenix into rural parts of northern Maricopa county. The Federal Elections Commission reports that as of December 31, 2007, Shadegg had raised over $1,000,000, Lord over $600,000, and Loyd $26,000. May and Winkler had not reported any fundraising.

This district was previously held by Arizona's junior United States senator, Republican Jon Kyl.
Race ranking and details from CQ Politics
Campaign contributions from OpenSecrets

Results 
Incumbent John Shadegg held his seat with about 54% of the votes.

District 4 

This district has been represented by Democrat Ed Pastor since 1991. He was challenged by Republican Don Karg, Libertarian Joe Cobb and Green Rebecca DeWitt. CQ Politics forecasted the race as 'Safe Democrat'.
Race ranking and details from CQ Politics
Campaign contributions from OpenSecrets

Results 
Incumbent Ed Pastor held his seat with about 72% of the votes.

District 5 

This district has been represented by Democrat Harry Mitchell since 2007.  Mitchell unseated conservative Republican J.D. Hayworth by 50% to 47% in this Republican-leaning district (Cook PVI: R+4) in the northeastern Phoenix suburbs that gave George W. Bush 54% of the vote in 2004. The largely Republican nature of this district made a tough 2008 race certain, though Mitchell, who has a government complex in Tempe named after him, had won a lot of tough elections in the past. Maricopa County Treasurer David Schweikert won the Republican primary against Susan Bitter Smith, former State Representative Laura Knaperek, State Representative Mark Anderson, Jim Ogsbury and Lee Gentry. Libertarian Warren Severin  also ran. CQ Politics forecasts the race as 'Leans Democratic'.
Race ranking and details from CQ Politics
Campaign contributions from OpenSecrets

Results 
Incumbent Harry Mitchell held his seat with about 53% of the votes.

District 6 

This district has been represented since 2001 by Republican Jeff Flake (campaign website), who is perhaps best known for his opposition to pork barrel projects and advocacy for earmark reform since 2001. He was challenged by Democrat Rebecca Schneider (campaign website) and Libertarian Rick Biondi.

Richard Grayson, an Apache Junction resident who ran as a write-in candidate in Florida's 4th congressional district in 2004, filed with the Federal Election Commission to run for this seat as a Democrat, as did trucking-firm account manager Chris Gramazio.  Schneider, a library supervisor from Mesa, also filed and ended up defeating Gramazio in the Democratic primary.

There was no Democratic candidate in this heavily Republican district in 2004 or 2006.  George W. Bush won with 64% here in 2004. CQ Politics forecasted the race as 'Safe Republican'.
Race ranking and details from CQ Politics
Campaign contributions from OpenSecrets

Results 
Incumbent Jeff Flake held his seat with about 62% of the votes.

District 7 

This district has been represented by Democrat Raúl Grijalva since 2003. He was challenged by Republican Joseph Sweeney and Libertarian Raymond Patrick Petrulsky. Republican Milton Chewning (campaign website), who previously ran for this seat in 2006, lost to Sweeney in the primary. CQ Politics forecasted the race as 'Safe Democrat'.
Race ranking and details from CQ Politics
Campaign contributions from OpenSecrets

Results 
Incumbent Raúl Grijalva held his seat with about 63% of the votes.

District 8 

Gabby Giffords was reelected for a second term.

Her challenger was Republican State Senate President Tim Bee. Libertarian Paul Davis and Independent Derek Tidball (campaign website) also ran. CQ Politics forecasted the race as 'Leans Democratic'.

Giffords defeated conservative Republican Randy Graf by a 54% to 42% margin in 2006. Bush narrowly won here with 52% to 47% for John Kerry in 2004.

Giffords attracted a lot of attention in late May and June due to the shuttle flight of her husband Mark E. Kelly, who served as commander of the space shuttle's STS-124 mission.

Bee's campaign generated state and national press coverage when his campaign co-chair, former Congressman Jim Kolbe, resigned and withdrew his support in early July. Kolbe had held the seat for 22 years until Giffords took office in 2007.

On July 13, The Arizona Republic summarized the race: "Giffords has proved adept at fundraising and is considered a rising star in Democratic circles. But Bee is one of the state's highest-profile political figures and has enlisted the support of some heavy-hitters, including President Bush, the headliner of a Tucson fundraiser planned for later this month." Giffords has the "advantages of incumbency. Plus, Bee is just off a tough legislative term in which he drew heavy criticism for his role in a state budget deal and the referral of an anti-gay-marriage proposal to the November ballot. Bee remains a popular political figure, and registered Republicans outnumber Democrats by more than 14,000 in the district." On July 16, The Arizona Republic reported that freshman Congresswoman Giffords "has proved to be the most successful fundraiser among the state's House delegation and now has more than $2 million in her campaign coffers."
Race ranking and details from CQ Politics
Campaign contributions from OpenSecrets
Bee (R) vs Giffords (D-i) graph of collected poll results from Pollster.com

Results  
Incumbent Gabrielle Giffords held her seat with about 55% of the vote.

{{Infobox election
| election_name = U.S. House of Representatives
| country = Arizona
| type = presidential
| ongoing = no
| previous_election = United States House of Representatives elections in Arizona, 2006
| previous_year = 2006
| next_election = United States House of Representatives elections in Arizona, 2010
| next_year = 2010
| election_date = November 4, 2008
| image1 = 
| nominee1 = Gabby Giffords
| running_mate1 = 
| party1 = Democratic Party (United States)
| popular_vote1 = 179,629
| percentage1 = '54.72%
| image2 = 
| nominee2 = Tim Bee
| running_mate2 = 
| party2 = Republican Party (United States)
| popular_vote2 = 140,553
| percentage2 = 42.82%
| map_image = 
| map_size = 
| map_caption = 
| title = U.S. Representative
| before_election = Gabby Giffords
| before_party = Democratic Party (United States)
| after_election = Gabby Giffords
| after_party = Democratic Party (United States)
}}

References
Specific

General
 2008 Competitive House Race Chart The Cook Political Report, November 4, 2008.
 2008 House Ratings The Rothenberg Political Report, November 2, 2008.

External links
Elections from the Arizona Secretary of StateU.S. Congress candidates for Arizona at Project Vote Smart
Arizona U.S. House Races from 2008 Race Tracker''
Campaign contributions for Arizona congressional races from OpenSecrets

2008
Arizona
United States House of Representatives